Awais Khan (born 20 April 1994) is a Pakistani cyclist. He rode in the time trial at the 2017 UCI Road World Championships. In 2019, he participated in Tour De Khunjerab Cycle Race, and completed with the first position in its third stage.

Major results

2015 
 1st RSF Cycle Race
 1st Tour of Mohmand

2016 
 10th Asian Cycling Championships U23 - ITT

2017 
63rd 84th World Championships - ITT

References

1994 births
Living people
Pakistani male cyclists